Un si joli village (Such a Lovely Town...) is a 1979 French film directed by Étienne Périer.

Cast and roles
Jean Carmet as Judge Fernand Noblet
Victor Lanoux as Stéphane Bertin
Valérie Mairesse as Muriel Olivier
Michel Robin as Gaspard
Gérard Jugnot as Fréval, the hotel manager
Francis Lemaire as maître Demaison, Bertin's lawyer
Alain Doutey as Debray
Gérard Caillaud as Larsac
Jacques Richard as Maurois, the unionist
Anne Bellec as Nelly Bertin, Stéphane's sister
Maurice Vallier as the doctor
Jacques Canselier as Javel
Jacques Chailleux as Riffaud
Étienne Périer: Nelly's husband
Mado Maurin as Élodie
Lionel Vitrant as Delteil
Bernard-Pierre Donnadieu as Arnoux
Christian de Tillière as le procureur
Jean Vigny as Priest Borie
Raymond Loyer as judge

External links

1979 films
Films about missing people
Films directed by Étienne Périer
French crime drama films
1970s French films